Ragazza Emancipata is an EP by the Italian punk rock band CCCP Fedeli alla linea released in 1990.

Track listing 
 "Ragazza Emancipata"
 "Tien An Men"
 "Trafitto (remix)"

Personnel 
 Giovanni Lindo Ferretti - vocals
 Massimo Zamboni - guitar
 Umberto Negri - bass
 Danilo Fatur - Artista del popolo, vocals
 Annarella Giudici - Benemerita soubrette, vocals

External links 
 Lyrics

See also
 CCCP discography
 Consorzio Suonatori Indipendenti (C.S.I.)
 Per Grazia Ricevuta (PGR)
 Punk rock

References and footnotes

CCCP Fedeli alla linea albums
1990 EPs